The 2018 FIBA Women's Basketball World Cup, the 18th edition of FIBA's premier international tournament for women's national basketball teams, was held in Tenerife, Canary Islands, Spain from 22 to 30 September 2018. This was the first edition to use the name of FIBA Women's Basketball World Cup. After the last edition in 2014, FIBA changed the name of the competition from the FIBA World Championship for Women, in order to align its name with that of the corresponding men's competition.

The United States were the two-time defending champions. This tournament saw the World Cup debut of Belgium, Latvia and Puerto Rico.

The US Team won the final against Australia, to win their third straight and tenth overall title.

Venues

Hosts selection
The whole bidding process started in October 2014. Bids from two nations were submitted. On 31 October 2014, it was confirmed that Spain and Israel were the bidders. On 16 December 2014, it was announced that Spain won the bid and would host the upcoming World Cup.

Qualification
Spain as the hosts automatically qualified for the tournament in December 2014. The United States were the next to qualify after winning Gold at the 2016 Summer Olympics.

The remaining teams were decided over June, July & August 2017 through the Women’s Continental Cups. The continental qualifiers vary in the number of teams; the European qualifiers featured 16 teams, Africa featured 12 teams, Americas featured 10 teams and Asia featured 8 teams. From the 46 teams competing for the final 14 spots, the field was completed by the top five teams from 2017 EuroBasket Women, the top three teams from the 2017 FIBA Women's AmeriCup, the two finalists from the 2017 Women's Afrobasket; as well as the top four teams from the 2017 FIBA Asia Women's Cup, which saw teams from Asia and Oceania compete together for the first time ever.

Format
The tournament was played in two phases. In the first phase, the 16 qualified teams were sorted into four groups of four (A-D), each team in a group played each other once, 24 games were played in the first phase. The top team from each group directly advanced to the quarterfinals. The teams that placed fourth in the group stage were eliminated. The teams placed second and third from each group advanced to the quarterfinal qualifications, where the winners of the qualification round then progressed to the quarterfinals, losers were eliminated.

In the second phase, a knockout stage was used to determine the champion. In the quarterfinals the four winners progressed to the semifinals, the four losers played in classification games for 5–8th. In total, 40 games were played over a total of 8 days.

Squads

Draw
The official draw ceremony took place on 6 February 2018, at San Cristóbal de la Laguna, Island of Tenerife, Canary Islands, Spain.

Seedings
Included are the respective FIBA World Rankings for women:

Preliminary round

Group A

Group B

Group C

Group D

Final round

Final

Final rankings

Awards and statistics

Awards
The All-Star Five was revealed on 30 September 2018.

MVP:  Breanna Stewart
 Breanna Stewart
 Diana Taurasi
 Astou Ndour
 Emma Meesseman
 Liz Cambage

Statistics

Player tournament averages

Points

Rebounds

Assists

Blocks

Steals

Team tournament averages

Points

Rebounds

Assists

Blocks

Steals

Tournament game highs

Marketing
The logo and branding identity was unveiled on 5 February 2018 at the La Laguna Gran Hotel in San Cristóbal de La Laguna, the logo is inspired by the treasures of the island of Tenerife, its coastlines and its heart of Spain.

The Mascot Tina the Turtle were also unveiled at the ceremony in the town hall of Santa Cruz de Tenerife on 7 August 2018, 6 Weeks before the Tournament kick off the mascot name is a short form of Tinerfina which means Coming from or Living from Tenerife, Both Logo and the Mascot were designed by a Tenerife Artist Raul Pena

References

External links
Official website

 
2018
World Cup, 2018
Sport in Tenerife
World Cup
World Cup
September 2018 sports events in Europe